James Miller (March 23, 1942 – October 22, 1994) was an American record producer and musician.  While he produced albums for dozens of different bands and artists, he is most closely associated for his work with several key musical acts of the 1960s and 1970s.

Miller rose to prominence working with the various bands of vocalist Steve Winwood (including Spencer Davis Group, Traffic, and Blind Faith).  His best acclaimed work was his late 1960s-early 1970s work with the Rolling Stones for whom he produced a string of singles and albums that rank among the most critically and financially successful works of the band's career: Beggars Banquet (1968), Let It Bleed (1969), Sticky Fingers (1971), Exile on Main St. (1972) and Goats Head Soup (1973). In the late 1970s, he began working with Motörhead and continued to produce until his death in 1994.

Early life
Miller was the son of Anne Wingate and Bill Miller, a Las Vegas entertainment director and the man who booked Elvis Presley into the International Hotel for his 1969 return to live performance.
Bill Miller was a Russian Jew who came to the United States with his family at the turn of the century. He owned a New Jersey nightclub called Bill Miller’s Riveria which attracted headline acts including future Rat Pack members Frank Sinatra, Dean Martin, Jerry Lewis, and Sammy Davis Jr. The club was closed in 1953 so the Palisades Interstate Parkway could be built. Miller then headed out west to Las Vegas, where he became entertainment director at the Sahara and, according to the Las Vegas Journal Review, “virtually invented the Las Vegas lounge show.” According to Jimmy’s half-sister Judith, “He helped integrate the show biz scene thereby booking Sammy Davis Jr., who was not permitted to stay in the hotel!” Judith recalled that "Jimmy’s musical life had started at age 8 playing the drums, writing music and crooning".

Career
Prior to working with the Rolling Stones, Miller had trained and worked as the protege of Stanley Borden (RKO, Artia, After Hours Unique). Borden, the original backer of Island Records, suggested Miller to Chris Blackwell, who brought him to the United Kingdom where his first task was to remix a single from the Spencer Davis Group which had done well in the UK charts, "Gimme Some Lovin'". Blackwell recalls that Miller introduces "a kind of wild magic" and "turns up the heat, threatens some kind of chaos", which results in "a new sound". Miller's remix entered the US top ten and broke the band in the country. He then co-wrote its follow-up "I'm A Man" with the band's singer-keyboardist, Steve Winwood. In addition to his production work for Winwood's band Traffic, Miller also contributed the lyrics to the Traffic song "Medicated Goo". During this period Miller also produced the first two albums by Spooky Tooth as well as the sole album by the Eric Clapton–Winwood supergroup Blind Faith.

Following his work with Blind Faith, Miller co-produced (with Delaney Bramlett) the hit Delaney & Bonnie album from 1969, On Tour with Eric Clapton. He went on to produce albums for Delaney & Bonnie keyboardist Bobby Whitlock, Kracker, the Plasmatics, Motörhead and the UK band Nirvana.

A drummer himself, Miller created a distinctive drum sound for his productions, especially with the Rolling Stones, on whose recordings he occasionally played.  Among his contributions include the opening cowbell on "Honky Tonk Women", and the main drumming on tracks such as  "You Can't Always Get What You Want", (where regular Stones drummer Charlie Watts was unable to play the correct "groove"), "Tumbling Dice" (where Watts was similarly troubled by the ending of the song), and songs such as "Happy"  and "Shine a Light" where Watts was absent from the recording sessions.

In the 1980s, Miller produced acts such as Johnny Thunders, MATRIX produced in 1988 in Warren RI, engineered by Phil Green as well as Jo Jo Laine (wife of Denny Laine, of the Moody Blues and Wings). In 1990 he co-produced (along with Phil Greene) "What's in A Name" for Florida band Walk the Chalk.

Miller went on to work with Primal Scream on their breakthrough album Screamadelica and William Topley's band the Blessing (Miller appears on their DVD Sugar Train during the song "Soul Love").

Among Miller's last productions were three tracks on the 1992 Wedding Present project, Hit Parade 2. He also produced four tracks on the World Bank's "In Debt Interview" which featured artists including Billy Preston and Bobby Keys, and a rare musical sideline from author Hunter S. Thompson. Miller traveled to Woody Creek, Colorado, in 1994 to meet with Thompson for a memorable weekend in May. Miller died on October 22, 1994, of liver failure.

Personal life

His daughter, rock singer Deena Miller, is from his marriage to Gayle Shepherd, a member of the singing group the Shepherd Sisters. Miller and his second wife Geraldine had a son, Michael, who died at the age of 32. Jimmy Miller had a stepson, Steven Miller, a news photographer who spent 25 years working for The New York Times and lives in Connecticut who is the surviving biological son of Geraldine Miller. Geraldine (known as Geri) died of breast cancer in 1991, three years before Jimmy Miller's own death in Denver, Colorado, at the age of 52, from liver failure.

His half-sister was Judith Miller, a Pulitzer Prize-winning journalist for The New York Times who was imprisoned for not revealing her sources in the Plame–Wilson CIA affair.

Discography (incomplete)

References

1942 births
1994 deaths
Deaths from liver failure
Record producers from New York (state)
American people of Belarusian-Jewish descent
American lyricists
Musicians from Brooklyn
Musicians from Denver
20th-century American musicians
20th-century American businesspeople
Songwriters from New York (state)